Bernard Valcourt,  (born February 18, 1952) is a Canadian politician and lawyer, who served as Member of Parliament for the electoral district of Madawaska—Restigouche, New Brunswick until he was defeated in the 2015 federal election.

Early federal political career and Mulroney cabinet
Valcourt was first elected to the House of Commons of Canada as a Progressive Conservative candidate in the 1984 election that brought Brian Mulroney to power. He was appointed to the Cabinet of Canada in 1986 as a Minister of State. In January 1989, he was promoted to Minister of Consumer and Corporate Affairs, but was forced to resign from Cabinet in August when he was involved in a drunk driving motorcycle accident that cost him an eye.

He returned to Cabinet seven months later as Minister of Fisheries and Oceans. In 1991, he was promoted to Minister of Employment and Immigration, and held the position until the government of Mulroney's successor as Progressive Conservative Party leader and prime minister, Kim Campbell, was defeated in the 1993 election. Valcourt was defeated in that election, along with every Tory MP in Atlantic Canada except Elsie Wayne.

Provincial leader
In May 1995, Valcourt was elected leader of the Progressive Conservative Party of New Brunswick. While he won a seat in the Legislative Assembly of New Brunswick in the 1995 provincial election, his party only won six seats against 48 for Frank McKenna's Liberals. Valcourt resigned as leader in 1997 following a lukewarm endorsement of his leadership at a party convention, and was succeeded by Bernard Lord.

Return to federal politics
On March 28, 2011, Valcourt declared his candidacy in the 2011 federal election, running in the riding of Madawaska—Restigouche, which covers the bulk of the territory he'd represented two decades earlier. He was elected on May 2, 2011, defeating Liberal incumbent Jean-Claude D'Amours.  He was subsequently appointed to cabinet as Minister of State for both the Atlantic Canada Opportunities Agency and La Francophonie.  
His sister Martine Coulombe was elected to the Legislative Assembly of New Brunswick in the 2010 provincial election. On July 4, 2012, he was given the additional portfolio of Associate Minister of Defence.
Valcourt was part of the AEG initiative, saying co-operation between both the federal and provincial governments, as well as utilities, is key. "The Atlantic Energy Gateway initiative has brought the critical players in the region's energy sector together to not only work toward an affordable, secure, clean energy future, but to also maximize the business and job growth potential of further developing our region's clean and renewable energy industries," said Valcourt in a release.

On February 22, 2013, Valcourt became Minister of Aboriginal Affairs and Northern Development in a cabinet shuffle. Valcourt stirred controversy when he claimed that the high rates of suicide among aboriginal youths were "the responsibility of their parents".

In the 2015 federal election, Valcourt was defeated by Liberal René Arseneault, finishing third with just over 16% of the vote.

Electoral record

|-

|Pierrette Ringuette
|align="right"|16,058
|align="right"|48.8
|align="right"|+5.0
|-

|Bernard Valcourt
|align="right"|15,045
|align="right"|45.7
|align="right"|−2.5
|-

|-

|Parise Martin
|align="right"|844
|align="right"|2.6
|align="right"|−5.4
|- bgcolor="white"
!align="left" colspan=3|Total
!align="right"|32,902
!align="right"|
!align="right"|

|-

|Bernard Valcourt
|align="right"|14,747
|align="right"|48.2
|align="right"|−3.7
|-

|Romeo Rossignol
|align="right"|13,385
|align="right"|43.8
|align="right"|+1.9
|-

|Réal Couturier
|align="right"|2,441
|align="right"|8.0
|align="right"|+1.8
|- bgcolor="white"
!align="left" colspan=3|Total
!align="right"|30,573
!align="right"|
!align="right"|

|-

|Bernard Valcourt
|align="right"|16,411
|align="right"|51.9
|align="right"|+29.0
|-

|Gerald Clavette
|align="right"|13,245
|align="right"|41.9
|align="right"|−23.9
|-

|Floranne McLaughlin-St-Amand
|align="right"|1,968
|align="right"|6.2
|align="right"|−5.1
|- bgcolor="white"
!align="left" colspan=3|Total
!align="right"|31,624
!align="right"|
!align="right"|

References

External links
Bernard Valcourt official site

1952 births
Living people
Members of the House of Commons of Canada from New Brunswick
Progressive Conservative Party of Canada MPs
Progressive Conservative Party of New Brunswick MLAs
Lawyers in New Brunswick
Members of the King's Privy Council for Canada
Leaders of the Progressive Conservative Party of New Brunswick
People from Edmundston
People from Restigouche County, New Brunswick
Conservative Party of Canada MPs
Members of the 24th Canadian Ministry
Members of the 25th Canadian Ministry
Members of the 28th Canadian Ministry
Ministers of Labour of Canada